The 2020 State of Origin series was the 39th annual best-of-three series between the Queensland and New South Wales rugby league teams. Before this series, Queensland has won 21 times, NSW 15 times, with two series drawn.

Originally, the series was to have been played in the traditional mid-season slot; however, due to the COVID-19 pandemic which caused the season to be suspended after round two, the series was moved to November, with the three matches to be played on consecutive Wednesday nights. On 15 May, the NRL announced that the matches would be played on three consecutive Wednesdays after the season's end, these being 4, 11 and 18 November.

For just the third time, a game was played away from Sydney, Brisbane or Melbourne, with Game 1 played at Adelaide’s Adelaide Oval.

Before the start of the series, Daily Telegraph journalist Dean Ritchie described the Queensland team as the worst ever Maroons side.  Queensland would go on to upset a highly fancied New South Wales side and win the series 2–1.

Game I

Game II

Game III

Player debuts

Game 1 

  Cap no. 288, Clinton Gutherson
  Cap no. 289, Luke Keary
  Cap no. 290, Junior Paulo
  Cap no. 204, AJ Brimson
  Cap no. 205, Xavier Coates
  Cap no. 206, Phillip Sami
  Cap no. 207, Jake Friend
  Cap no. 208, Tino Fa'asuamaleaui
  Cap no. 209, Lindsay Collins
  Cap no. 210, Jaydn Su'A
  Cap no. 211, Kurt Capewell

Game 2 

  Cap no. 291, Nathan Brown
  Cap no. 292, Isaah Yeo
  Cap no. 212, Dunamis Lui
  Cap no. 213, Moeaki Fotuaika

Game 3 

  Cap no. 214, Corey Allan
  Cap no. 215, Edrick Lee
  Cap no. 216, Brenko Lee
  Cap no. 217, Harry Grant

Teams

New South Wales Blues 

1 – Tom Trbojevic was originally selected in the squad, but was subsequently forced to withdraw due to injury. He was replaced by Zac Lomax.

Queensland Maroons 

1 – Kalyn Ponga was originally selected in the squad, but was subsequently forced to withdraw due to injury.

Women's State of Origin

References 

State of Origin series